The Uisko class, also known as the Marine Alutech Watercat M11 landing craft is a type of vessel in use by the Finnish Navy. It is the predecessor of the Jurmo class landing craft. Uisko was the first water jet vessel of the Finnish Navy. It features excellent maneuverability and low draft suitable for shallow waters. It can be used for amphibious assault and transport of marine infantry. The uisko has a cargo capacity of 2.5 tons.

Vessels 
 U-200 series: U210-U211
 U-300 series: U301-U317
 U-400 series: U400-
 U-600 Series: U601-638 (Jurmo class)
 U-700 series: U700-712 (Jehu class)

See also
 G-class landing craft
 Jurmo-class landing craft
 Jehu-class landing craft

References

External links 
 Finnish Defence Forces Website of The Finnish Defence Forces
 Marine Alutech Website of Marine Alutech

Ships of the Finnish Navy
Ships built in Finland
Landing craft